All Saints' Church is in Queens Road, Hertford, Hertfordshire, England. It is an active Anglican parish church in the deanery of Hertford and Ware, the archdeaconry of Hertford, and the diocese of St Albans. It is the civic church of the town and of the county. The church is recorded in the National Heritage List for England as a designated Grade II* listed building. It is the largest church in Hertfordshire, other than St Albans Cathedral, and can seat up to 1,000 people.

History

The parish dates back to before the 10th century, and a church was present on the site at the time of the Domesday Survey. This church was replaced during the 15th century by a church with a cruciform plan and a west tower. The parish of All Saints was merged with that of St John in the 17th century. On 22 December 1891 the church was destroyed by fire. A competition was held to design a new church, which was won by the Lancaster firm of architects, Paley, Austin and Paley. The foundation stone was laid on 25 March 1893 and the new church was consecrated by the Bishop of St Albans on 20 February 1895.  The insurance for the old church paid only £2.800, toward the cost, and a further £12,500 was raised by public subscription. In 1904–05 the church was completed at the west end and by adding the tower. This was done by the Lancaster practice, now known as Austin and Paley, and cost £10,366. In 1934 the Memorial Chapel was completed to the memory of those who died in the First World War. New glass doors were added at the west end of the church in 2003.

Architecture

Exterior
The church is constructed in red Runcorn sandstone, with lead and tiled roofs. Its architectural style is Gothic Revival (Perpendicular). The plan consists of a nave with a clerestory, north and south aisles, a northwest porch, a north transept, a chancel with a north vestry, a south chapel, and a west tower. The tower is in three stages, with a half-octagonal stair turret on the north side, and buttresses at the angles. It has a west door above which is a five-light window. In the middle stage are two-light windows and clock faces on all sides. The top stage contains two-light louvred bell openings, one on the north side, and two on the others. The parapet is castellated and traceried, with gargoyles at the corners, and crocketed pinnacles rising from the corners and the centre of each side. The summit of the stair turret is also castellated, and is surmounted by a spirelet. The aisles are divided into bays by buttresses, each bay containing a three-light window. The clerestory has two two-light flat-headed windows in each bay. At the northwest corner of the church is a two-storey hexagonal porch, with angle buttresses, and two-light windows. On each side of the church, at the junction of the nave and chancel, are octagonal turrets with castellated parapets and low domes. In the north transept is a five-light window, and the vestry has two- and three-light windows. The south chapel has three bays, two-light windows on the south side, and a four-light window on the east side. The east window of the chancel has seven lights. On the side walls of the chancel are panels carved with texts; on the north side the text is from Psalm 103, and on the south side it is from the Te Deum.

Interior
The tower is supported by large octagonal piers. The six-bay arcades are carried on octagonal columns. At the entrance to the south chapel is an oak screen inserted in 1961. Two steps lead up from the nave to the chancel. The alabaster reredos, presented to the church in 1914, contains a carved panel depicting the Last Supper and four saints. In the south wall of the chancel is a small piscina and a twin sedilia. The half-octagonal sandstone pulpit is attached to the pier between the nave and the chancel. The font is of polished fossil limestone, and consists of a carved octagonal bowl carried on a column. The stained glass in the east window, dated 1900, is by Kempe. The stained glass in the east window of the Memorial Chapel was designed by J .N. C. Bewsey, and depicts four martyrs. The glass on the north side of the church is by Shrigley and Hunt. The memorials include fragments of brasses surviving from the earlier church dating from the 15th century. The chapel contains a marble memorial to the 1st Battalion of the Hertfordshire Regiment, designed in 1921 by Reginald Blomfield. The three-manual organ dates from 1899 to 1900, and was made by Henry Willis & Sons. Additions were made to it by the same firm in 1910. It was rebuilt in 1971 by Cedric Arnold, Williamson & Hyatt following fire damage. It was rebuilt again with some additions in 2001 by the Village Workshop. There is a ring of ten bells, all cast in 1907 by Mears and Stainbank at the Whitechapel Bell Foundry.

Organ
The organ was installed in 1898 by Henry Willis. The casework was installed, along with a new pedal stop, in 1913. The organ was hand-blown until 1923 when an electric blower was installed. The original specification, including 'prepared for' stops such as the Pedal Ophicleide (added 1971) and Great Clarion (added 2001) can be found in the National Pipe Organ Register at N14556. In 1971 the firm of Cedric Arnold, Williamson & Hyatt of Thaxted, overhauled the organ. A total of sixteen new stops were added, mostly in line with proposals Willis made, completing the choruses of Great and Swell, adding mutations to the Choir and enhancing the Pedal. The 1971 specification is stored at N13066 
Between November 2000 and April 2001 the Village Workshop restored the organ. The work was in three parts: the complete overhaul of all the leatherwork (most dated from 1899); enhancements to the action and piston control systems; the addition of new stops: a Fanfare Trumpet, Great Clarion (as Willis intended) and 32' Reed (installed in October 2001). All the new pipe-work was specially made to match the Willis originals.

External features
Among the memorials in the churchyard are five that have been designated as Grade II listed buildings. They are: a chest tomb in white Portland stone dated 1774, a chest tomb in stuccoed brick dating from the 18th century, two stone gravestones from the 18th century, a headstone in carved Portland stone dated 1711, and a group of six headstones dating from the late 18th and early 19th centuries.

Notable interments 
William Tutty

See also

Grade II* listed buildings in East Hertfordshire
List of works by Paley, Austin and Paley
List of ecclesiastical works by Austin and Paley (1895–1914)

References
Notes

Citations

Bibliography

Further reading

Church of England church buildings in Hertfordshire
Grade II* listed churches in Hertfordshire
Paley, Austin and Paley buildings
Gothic Revival church buildings in England
Gothic Revival architecture in Hertfordshire